Elie Y. Katz (born July 16, 1974) is an American politician and businessman. He served as the Mayor of Teaneck, New Jersey from 2006 to 2008.

Biography
Katz was born on July 16, 1974, in Teaneck, New Jersey. He attended Torah Academy of Bergen County and  graduated from Touro College.

Katz was elected to the Teaneck Township Council in 1997. 
He was elected Mayor of Teaneck in 2006, making him the youngest person to serve in that office as well as the first Orthodox Jew. Katz served until 2008, when he was replaced by Kevie Feit. Katz served as deputy mayor in 2016 when Lizette Parker died in office. He thus filled in as acting mayor for several months until the town council elected Mohammed Hameeduddin on July 1, 2016.

Katz is currently serving his sixth term on Teaneck's Township Council.

Business
Katz is currently the CEO of National Retail Solutions, a subsidiary of IDT Corporation. He previously worked for Fabrix Systems, Citizens Choice Energy, and Zedge. On January 22, 1996, Katz opened the Kosher Chinese style Restaurant, Chopstix, in Teaneck, New Jersey.

References

External links
Katz's personal website

1974 births
Living people
Jewish American people in New Jersey politics
American Orthodox Jews
Mayors of Teaneck, New Jersey
New Jersey city council members
Touro College alumni
People from Teaneck, New Jersey
21st-century American Jews